The 1953–54 season was the 55th completed season of The Football League, which ran from August 1953 until April 1954.

Final league tables
The tables below are reproduced here in the exact form that they can be found at The Rec.Sport.Soccer Statistics Foundation website and in Rothmans Book of Football League Records 1888–89 to 1978–79, with home and away statistics separated.

Beginning with the season 1894–95, clubs finishing level on points were separated according to goal average (goals scored divided by goals conceded), or more properly put, goal ratio. In case one or more teams had the same goal difference, this system favoured those teams who had scored fewer goals. The goal average system was eventually scrapped beginning with the 1976–77 season.

From the 1922–23 season, the bottom two teams of both Third Division North and Third Division South were required to apply for re-election.

First Division

Wolverhampton Wanderers won the First Division title for the first time in their history, finishing four points ahead of their local rivals West Bromwich Albion, who lifted their fourth FA Cup in the same season. Defending champions Arsenal slumped to 12th.

Middlesbrough and Liverpool were relegated to the Second Division.

Results

Maps

Second Division

Results

Maps

Third Division North

Results

Maps

Third Division South

Results

Maps

See also
1953-54 in English football

References

Ian Laschke: Rothmans Book of Football League Records 1888–89 to 1978–79. Macdonald and Jane’s, London & Sydney, 1980.

English Football League seasons
Eng
1953–54 in English football leagues